Krista Lynn Phillips (born May 18, 1988) is a Canadian former basketball centre, who last played for the Dandenong Rangers of the Australian WNBL.

Career

Michigan Wolverines
In her junior year at University of Michigan, Phillips earned her third varsity letter. She played in all 30 games with seven starts and averaged 18.9 minutes per game. She ranked second on the team in blocks with 28 (0.89 per game) and scored in double figures in six games. During the season, she posted her 100th career block; and became one of six Wolverines with 100-plus career blocks. At season’s end, she ranked 19th in the Big Ten in rebounding, averaging 5.2 rebounds per game. Some of the highlights of her season included: 
Tallied a season-high six  blocks in the season-opener at Kentucky (November 15).
Played a season-best 35 minutes against Texas A&M (November 20).
Lone Wolverine to post double figure rebounds on the season with 10 against North Carolina State (December 5) and 11 at Purdue (February 26).
She scored a season-high 16 points against Iowa (January 26).
Was 5-of-5 from the floor against Penn State (February 9).
Posted a season-high 11 rebounds against Purdue (February 26).
Recorded Michigan’s lone double-double of the season with 10 points and 11 rebounds against Purdue (February 26).

Michigan statistics

Source

Team Canada
She was a two-year member of Canada's Junior National Team (2005–06). At the 2006 FIBA Americas Under-18 World Championship Qualification Tournament in Colorado Springs, Colorado, she was part of a silver medal winning team. At the tournament, she averaged 5.8 points and 4.3 rebounds in four games.
At the 2005 FIBA Under-19 World Championship in Tunisia, she averaged 8.7 points, a team-high 7.4 rebounds and 1.1 blocks in seven games. She was an alternate on Canada's 2004 Junior National Team.
From 2001-2005, she was a four-year member of Team Saskatchewan. At the 2005 Canada Summer Games, she led Team Saskatchewan to a fifth-place finish.
Of note, she played with former Michigan Wolverine teammate Stephany Skrba on Canada's Junior National Team in 2005.

WNBL
Phillips signed with the Dandenong Rangers of Australia's WNBL for the 2011/12 season. One of her teammates was LA Sparks guard Jenna O'Hea.

Olympic Games
Krista was part of Team Canada during the London 2012 Summer Olympics.

Career stats

Personal
Her sister Sara, was a junior on the University of Rhode Island's volleyball team.

References

1988 births
Living people
Basketball players at the 2012 Summer Olympics
Canadian expatriate basketball people in Australia
Canadian expatriate basketball people in the United States
Canadian women's basketball players
Centers (basketball)
Michigan Wolverines women's basketball players
Olympic basketball players of Canada
Sportspeople from Saskatoon